Nelly Buntschu (born 10 December 1947) is a Swiss politician of the Swiss Party of Labour.

Political career 
Buntschu has been a member of the Swiss Party of Labour for over two decades, serving often in the leadership of the party's Geneva cantonal branch. She was elected the party president in August 2007, and served until giving up the position to Norberto Crivelli in 2009. Previously, she held office for eight years from 1999 to 2007 as Mayor of Vernier.

Buntschu is not very well known at the national level. At the local level, especially during her tenure as Mayor of Vernier, the development of public transport and the promotion of affordable housing were among her main concerns.

Personal life 
Buntschu was born on 10 December 1947, in Vernier. Buntschu is the mother of two daughters, and has one grandchild. She is vice president of a housing construction foundation in the area of Vernier.

References

External links 
 Biography on the Swiss Party of Labour website

1947 births
Living people
People from the canton of Geneva
Women mayors of places in Switzerland
20th-century Swiss women politicians
20th-century Swiss politicians
21st-century Swiss women politicians
21st-century Swiss politicians